Dan Bahadur Kurmi is a Nepalese politician, belonging to the Socialist Party of Nepal.

History 
He was elected to the Pratinidhi Sabha in the 1999 election from the Kapilvastu-1 constituency as a candidate of the Communist Party of Nepal (Unified Marxist-Leninist). He won by 14494 votes, defeating the incumbent Kamlesh Kumar Sharma of the Nepali Congress.

In February 2008, Chaudhari resigned from the parliament and the CPN(UML) and joined the Tarai-Madhesh Loktantrik Party.

In the 2008 Constituent Assembly election he was elected from the Kapilvastu-2 constituency, winning 8434 votes.

See also
 Socialist Party of Nepal

References 

Living people
Year of birth missing (living people)
Socialist Party of Nepal politicians

Nepal MPs 1999–2002
Communist Party of Nepal (Unified Marxist–Leninist) politicians

Members of the 1st Nepalese Constituent Assembly